Robert "Roy" Milne (27 April 1921 – 29 June 1998) was a Scottish-American association football defender who earned one cap with the United States men's national soccer team.

Player

Club
Milne began his career with Dunipace Thistle. In August 1940, he moved to Polkemmet Juniors. In November 1940, new Celtic manager Jimmy McStay made Milne his first signing as manager. He left the team to serve in the RAF during World War II. He returned to Celtic after the war and played for them until being released in May 1952. Milne made 108 Scottish Football League appearances for Celtic. He then moved to the United States where he signed with the New York Americans of the American Soccer League. In 1954, the Americans won the 1954 National Challenge Cup. In 1955, he and his wife moved to California, where he played for the Los Angeles Danish-Americans. By the late 1950s, Milne was with the amateur McIlvaine Canvasbacks of the Los Angeles League. In 1959, Milne and his teammates won the 1959 National Challenge Cup. In 1973, he and his wife owned and operated a hotel in Alva, Clackmannanshire.

International
Milne earned one cap with the U.S. national team in a 6–3 loss to England on June 8, 1953.

Manager
While in California, Milne managed several teams, including the United Scots of Beverly Hills.

See also
List of United States men's international soccer players born outside the United States

External links
 Celtic: Roy Milne

References 

1921 births
1998 deaths
American soccer players
American Soccer League (1933–1983) players
Celtic F.C. players
New York Americans (soccer) (1933–1956) players
Scottish footballers
Scottish expatriate footballers
Scottish Football League players
British emigrants to the United States
United States men's international soccer players
Association football defenders
Scottish expatriate sportspeople in the United States
Expatriate soccer players in the United States